Max Mack (1884–1973) was a German screenwriter, film producer and director during the silent era. He is particularly known for his 1913 film The Other. He directed, and co-starred in, an early film adaptation of Dr. Jekyll and Mr. Hyde in 1914, called Ein Seltsamer Fall, written by Richard Oswald. During the 1910s, he directed nearly a hundred films in a variety of different genres.

Born as Moritz Myrthenzweig in Halberstadt, the Jewish Mack was later forced to emigrate to escape Nazism, and settled in the United Kingdom. His final film was the 1935 quota quickie Be Careful, Mr. Smith.

Selected filmography

Director
 The Other (1913)
 The Blue Mouse (1913)
 Where Is Coletti? (1913)
 A World Without Men (1914)
 Ein Seltsamer Fall (1914) A film adaptation of Dr. Jekyll and Mr. Hyde
 Robert and Bertram (1915)
 The Confessions of the Green Mask (1916)
 The Maharaja's Favourite Wife (1921)
 Quarantäne (1923)
 The Beautiful Girl (1923)
 Father Voss (1925)
 The Uninvited Guest (1925)
 The Girl with a Patron (1925)
 The Wooing of Eve (1926)
 Fight of the Tertia (1929)
 Only on the Rhine (1930)
 A Thousand for One Night (1933)
 Be Careful, Mr. Smith (1935)

Actor
 Japanisches Opfer (1910) - Der Edelmütige
 Die Pulvermühle (1910)
 Dienertreue (1911)
 Ihr Jugendfreund (1911)
 Madame Potiphar (1911)
 Die Ballhaus-Anna (1911)
 Opfer der Untreue (1911)
 Gehirnreflexe (1911)
 Coeur-As (1912)
 Dämon Eifersucht (1912) - Max
 Das Bild der Mutter (1912) - Max
 Ein Kampf im Feuer (1912) - Egon
 Das Ende vom Liede (1912)
 Ein seltsamer Fall (1914) - Selbst / Himself
 Hans und Hanni (1915)
 Der Sturz des Hauses Macwell (1918)
 You Belong to Me (1934) - Jack Mandel (final film role)

References

Bibliography
 Elsaesser, Thomas & Wedel, Michael. A Second Life: German Cinema's First Decades. Amsterdam University Press, 1996.
 Ragowski, Christian. The Many Faces of Weimar Cinema: Rediscovering Germany's Filmic Legacy. Camden House, 2010.

External links

1884 births
1973 deaths
Film people from Saxony-Anhalt
People from Halberstadt
Jewish emigrants from Nazi Germany to the United Kingdom